Lowca had two railway stations that served the village of Lowca in the former county of Cumberland, England, which is now part of Cumbria.

The line was originally a waggonway that conveyed coal from a drift mine at Lowca to Harrington Harbour and later to Harrington Iron Works. As the demand for greater quantities of coal to feed the ironworks was most important new mines with vertical shafts were sunk.  These were named after the parent ironworks and took the name of Harrington with a shaft number to identify them, such as Harrington No.4 and Harrington No.9.

A public passenger service ran from the 1st station between 2 June 1913 and when the 2nd Lowca Station was completed in August 1913 public services ran until they ceased in May 1926. After the Light Railway order ended the private workmen's service continued until April 1929, after which the workmen's trains ceased.

There never was a public Sunday service.

The first station at Lowca was built by Bain & Co. who owned the colliery and Harrington Ironworks.  It was situated in the colliery yard and was closed to public passenger use when the second station at Lowca was opened in August 1913.

The second station was on the Harrington and Lowca Light Railway which connected with the Cleator & Workington Junction Railway (CWJR) at Rosehill Junction south of Harrington Village. At different times workmen's services to Lowca ran from four places:
Public passenger trains ran from these last two only.

For many years there has been confusion regarding the stations at Lowca, with the two stations in the village being treated as one. The first official passenger service terminated in the colliery yard as shown in the photo.  The 1st station continued in use until 1929 for workmen's trains but for passenger use the 2nd Lowca Station was the terminus.

Freight services
The railway through Lowca was first and foremost a mineral railway, with the short-lived workmen's and passenger services an afterthought. Lines first reached Lowca at the end of the Nineteenth Century, eventually running northwards towards Workington and southeastwards to meet the Gilgarran Branch at Bain's Siding. The driving forces were coal, fireclay at nearby Micklam, coke and coking bi-products. Centrepiece for over fifty years was Harrington No. 10 Colliery which, confusingly, was not in Harrington, but in Lowca.

Between them these industrial concerns sustained the railway through Lowca until final closure to all traffic in May 1973.

See also
 Gilgarran Branch
 Cleator and Workington Junction Railway

References

Sources

Further reading

External links
 The closed station on an inter-war OS map National Library of Scotland
 The station Rail Map Online
 Latterday steam at Lowca flickr
 Latterday steam at Lowca flickr
 Industrial relics at Lowca flickr
 The station and line railwaycodes
 The Harrington collieries Haig Pit Mining Museum

Disused railway stations in Cumbria
Railway stations in Great Britain opened in 1913
Railway stations in Great Britain closed in 1926
1913 establishments in England